Jack Rooke is an English comedian and writer from Watford. His work often explores issues surrounding grief and loss, using humour and documentary film to explore the awkwardness of death.

Works

Stage 
His debut show Good Grief which played at the Soho Theatre, earnt Rooke a nomination for Best Show by an Emerging Artist in the Total Theatre Awards 2015 and a mention in The New York Times’ Top Theatre highlights of the Edinburgh Festival 2015. The show protested against government proposals to cut Widowed Parents Allowance, a basic weekly welfare payment for bereaved families in Britain. In collaboration with the Childhood Bereavement Network, the show aimed to raise awareness of these cuts.

Good Grief headlined Soho Theatre's first ever #SohoRising season, aiming to showcase the best ‘emerging companies, young people and brave new writing.' BBC Comedy commissioned Good Grief for a Radio 4 adaptation, broadcast in March 2017.

His second show Happy Hour was commissioned by Soho Theatre and premiered at the Edinburgh Festival 2017 to critical acclaim and a nomination for The Scotsmans first ever Mental Health Arts award.

Television 
His debut BBC Three series Happy Man was broadcast in April 2017, a documentary exploring alternative solutions to the male mental health crisis, which was nominated for Best Factual in the iTalkTelly Awards 2017 and earned Rooke a place on the BBC New Talent Hotlist 2017. He also received Broadcast magazine's TV Writing Hot Shot 2017.

Rooke later created and wrote Big Boys, a semi-autobiographical comedy for Channel 4, based on his Edinburgh Fringe shows. Broadcast in 2022, it revolves around a fictionalised version of Rooke attending university and exploring his sexuality while grieving for his father, helped by his friendship with his more extroverted flatmate.

Publications 
He is an ambassador for male suicide prevention charity CALM and deputy edited their free lifestyle publication The CALMzine from 2013–2015. He picked up the 2016 Mind Media award for Best Publication. In 2020 Penguin books published Jack Rooke’s memoir Cheer the F**k Up.  It campaigns with wit and candour for recognition of the mental health struggles of young people.

Personal life
Rooke is openly queer.

References

Year of birth missing (living people)
Place of birth missing (living people)
Living people
English activists
English male comedians
English male writers
People from Watford
English LGBT entertainers
British LGBT comedians